Tressa Thompson (born May 6, 1975, in Bloomfield, Nebraska) is an American shot putter.

Career
She is a three-time NCAA shot put champion from the University of Nebraska in the late 1990s. In the early 1990s, Thompson won several high school shot put state titles. In 2000, she placed second at the USA Indoor shot put competition.

Personal life
Just before she was due to go to the 2000 USA Olympics Trials, Tressa tested positive for cocaine and methamphetamine.

Her addictions became the focus of an episode of the A&E television series Intervention. Following the show Tressa was sent to a 90-day intensive in-patient therapy known as "Hope By The Sea". She also reportedly went from the treatment facility to a sober living facility to continue her sobriety.  According to the show, Tressa has been sober since March 2010, having had several relapses since the initial show about her addiction was filmed in 2007.

In 2016, Tressa opened a training center to focus on building better athletes.

References

1975 births
Living people
American female shot putters
Nebraska Cornhuskers women's track and field athletes
Universiade medalists in athletics (track and field)
People from Creighton, Nebraska
Universiade bronze medalists for the United States
Medalists at the 1997 Summer Universiade